Salpesia is a genus of jumping spiders that was first described by Eugène Louis Simon in 1901.

Species
 it contains five species, four that occur in Australia and one species found on the Seychelles.
Salpesia bicolor (Keyserling, 1883) – Australia (Queensland)
Salpesia bimaculata (Keyserling, 1883) – Australia (New South Wales)
Salpesia soricina Simon, 1901 (type) – Seychelles
Salpesia squalida (Keyserling, 1883) – Australia (Queensland, New South Wales)
Salpesia villosa (Keyserling, 1883) – Australia

References

Salticidae genera
Salticidae
Spiders of Africa
Spiders of Australia
Taxa named by Eug%C3%A8ne Simon